Airlie Parish Kirk is a church in Airlie, Angus. It was completed in 1783 and dedicated to St. Meddan. The interior was renovated in 1893. The church contains pre-Reformation relics.

References

External links
 Kirkton of Airlie Churchyard Photographs

Church of Scotland churches in Scotland
Churches in Angus, Scotland
Category B listed buildings in Angus, Scotland
History of Angus, Scotland
Listed churches in Scotland